Sean Michel is a musician from Bryant, Arkansas.  He was initially known most widely for his appearance on American Idol Season 6.  Prior to his appearance on the show, he toured with his band for several years.

Personal life
Michel was born August 21, 1979 in New Orleans, Louisiana.  His family relocated to the Little Rock area in the early Nineties.

Early career (2003-2009)

In 2003, after returning from a stint in China, Michel recruited friend and bass player Nick Taylor to play with him. By 2005 the band added drummer Joie Lyle and was touring on a consistent basis.

In 2006, Michel auditioned for American Idol "on a whim". He auditioned in Memphis, Tennessee, and then spent a lot of time in Memphis and later in Hollywood as part of his American Idol commitment.   His national profile developed as his audition of "God's Gonna Cut You Down" impressed the judges and when it aired in January 2007 his media exposure increased substantially.

By this time, Michel was touring regularly with a full band, which spent the latter half of 2007 recording its debut full-length album. Their debut album, titled "The Thrill of Hope", was released in December 2007.

Modern career (2009-present)

Lacking a band to perform with, Michel turned to long-time friend Andy Turner to record demos for songs-in-progress.

In early 2009, Michel met guitarist Alvin Rapien, who attended the same church. Their collaboration resulted in Rapien becoming Michel's guitar player. Michel toured solo through India and Nepal for over two months around this time. In late 2009, Michel released "I Know I've Been Converted", a blues-influenced album mixing his renditions of several old spirituals with original songs. The album never had an official release date, but physical copies became available in late 2009 and digital downloads became available in 2010.

In 2010, Michel was invited to Chile to play in coordination with relief efforts after the 2010 Chile earthquake. Michel brought a band to play several shows throughout that country. During this time, bassist Seth Atchley joined the band.

In 2011, Sean Michel announced a fundraising effort for a new record. Michel and his associates ran the Arkansas Stage at Cornerstone Festival for a third straight year in 2011 developing it from an indie "generator stage" to a significant attraction by the festival's final year in 2012. By this point in time, Michel was an assured guitarist fronting a strong blues-based trio. The "Electric Delta" album showcasing this approach with Atchley and Batterton was released in 2013.

Following the last Cornerstone Festival in 2012, Michel was prominent among those who started the AudioFeed Festival in Urbana, IL, where Michel has been a featured performer from 2013 onward at a reconstituted Arkansas Stage that is one of the primary stages of this festival.

In July 2016 Michel launched a Kickstarter campaign for a new album project focused on "Roots Gospel music" that would be a mix of original gospel songs with old traditional tunes to be produced and engineered by Paul Moak at Smoakstack Studios in Nashville. Musicians booked to record include Jimmy Abegg, Aaron Smith, and Eddie DeGarmo.

Citations

References
Official Sean Michel Facebook Page
Relevant Magazine Interview
Baptist Press Article
Entertainment Weekly
Reality TV Magazine

Singers from Arkansas
American Idol participants
Living people
People from Bryant, Arkansas
Year of birth missing (living people)